Florin Mergea and Horia Tecău successfully defended their title, defeating Adam Feeney and Chris Guccione in the final, 7–6(7–4), 7–5 to win the boys' doubles tennis title at the 2003 Wimbledon Championships.

Seeds

  Florin Mergea /  Horia Tecău (champions)
  Brian Baker /  Phillip Simmonds (semifinals)
  Brendan Evans /  Scott Oudsema (quarterfinals)
  György Balázs /  Dudi Sela (first round, retired)

Draw

Draw

References

External links

Boys' Doubles
Wimbledon Championship by year – Boys' doubles